This list comprises all players who have participated in at least one league match for Sporting Kansas City (formerly known as Kansas City Wiz and Kansas City Wizards) since the team's first Major League Soccer season in 1996. Players who were on the roster but never played a first team game are not listed; players who appeared for the team in other competitions (US Open Cup, CONCACAF Champions League, etc.) but never actually made an MLS appearance are noted at the bottom of the page.

A "†" denotes players who only appeared in a single match.

A
  Saad Abdul-Salaam
  Korede Aiyegbusi
  Yari Allnut
  Ever Alvarado †
  Mike Ammann
  Emiliano Amor 
  Jalil Anibaba
  Bernardo Añor
  Emmanuel Appiah †
  Stephen Armstrong
  Davy Arnaud
  Stéphane Auvray

B
  Matt Besler
  Claudio Bieler
  Brian Bliss
  Sean Bowers
  Dustin Branan †
  Omar Bravo
  Chris Brown
  Chris Brunt
  Alex Bunbury
  Teal Bunbury
  José Burciaga, Jr.
  Mike Burns
  Peter Byaruhanga

C
  Servando Carrasco
  Júlio César
  Sunil Chhetri
  Mark Chung
  Jorge Claros
  Nuno André Coelho
  Aurélien Collin
  Eloy Colombano
  Jimmy Conrad
  Bobby Convey
  Igor Costrov 
  Adam Cristman
  Daneil Cyrus

D
  Nino Da Silva
  Brad Davis
  Marcel de Jong
  Jake Dancy
  John DeBrito
  Cesar Delgado
  Justin Detter
  Amadou Dia
  John Diffley
  Birahim Diop
  Ihor Dotsenko
  Dom Dwyer

E
  Eric Eichmann
  Samuel Ekeme
  Kevin Ellis
  Pablo Escobar
  Roger Espinoza

F
  Darío Fabbro
  Benny Feilhaber
  Narciso Fernandes
  Vicente Figueroa

G
  Nick Garcia
  Josh Gardner
  Gary Glasgow
  Francisco Gomez
  Hérculez Gómez
  Richard Gough
  Taylor Graham
  Michael Green
  Andrew Gregor
  Matt Groenwald
  Andy Gruenebaum
  Diego Gutierrez
 Felipe Gutiérrez

H
  Connor Hallisey
  Michael Harrington
  Pat Harrington
  Wolde Harris
  Kevin Hartman
  Chris Henderson
  Zoltán Hercegfalvi
  William Hesmer
  Santiago Hirsig
  Aaron Hohlbein
  Jermaine Hue
  Goran Hunjak

J
  Tahj Jakins
  Jéferson
  Mechack Jérôme
  Jack Jewsbury
  Will John
  Brian Johnson
  Eddie Johnson
  Mo Johnston
  Peterson Joseph
  Igor Julião

K
  Michael Kafari 
  Kei Kamara
  Alec Kann
  Jon Kempin
  Gadi Kinda 
  Chris Klein
  Frank Klopas
  Kevin Koetters
  Nikos Kounenakis 
  Michael Kraus
  Eric Kronberg

L
  Garth Lagerwey
  Alexi Lalas
  Roy Lassiter
  Jonathan Leathers
  Cristian Lobato
  Claudio López
  Mikey Lopez
  Scott Lorenz †
  Onandi Lowe

M
  Justin Mapp
  Luis Marín
  Carlos Marinelli
  Pete Marino
  Neven Marković
  Matt Marquess
  Alex Martínez
  Rauwshan McKenzie
  Matt McKeon
  Jimmy Medranda
  Tim Melia
  Tony Meola
  Jamel Mitchell
  Miklos Molnar
  Kurt Morsink
  Yura Movsisyan
  Soni Mustivar
  Chance Myers

N
  Paulo Nagamura
  Krisztián Németh
  Jimmy Nielsen

O
  Uche Okafor
  Amobi Okugo
  Lawrence Olum
  Ike Opara
  Bo Oshoniyi

P
  Erik Palmer-Brown
  Tyler Pasher 
  Jacob Peterson
  Steve Pittman
  Nelson Pizarro
  Ryan Pore
  Cameron Porter
  Alan Prampin
  Brandon Prideaux
  Alan Pulido
  John Pulskamp 
  Roberto Punčec

Q
  Eric Quill
  Jordi Quintillà

R
  Sergei Raad
  Preki Radosavljević 
  Vuk Rašović
  Ryan Raybould
  Tommy Reasoner
  Winston Reid 
  Paul Rideout
  Brian Roberts
  Craig Rocastle
  Edmundo Rodriguez
  Oriol Rosell
  Diego Rubio
   Johnny Russell
  Abdul Rwatubyaye

S
  Soony Saad
  Refik Šabanadžović
  Dániel Sallói 
  Richard Sánchez 
  Mark Santel
  C. J. Sapong
  Luke Sassano
  Scott Sealy
  Dionysius Sebwe 
  Damian Silvera
  Igor Simutenkov
  Seth Sinovic
  Ryan Smith
  Chris Snitko
  Yann Songo'o 
  Mike Sorber
  Tony Soto
  Kevin Souter
  Khari Stephenson
  Martin Steuble
  Miloš Stojčev
  Colton Storm 
  Antti Sumiala

T
  Vitalis Takawira
  Carey Talley
  Matt Taylor
  Michael Thomas
  Shavar Thomas
  Abe Thompson
  Ryan Tinsley
  Toni
  Iván Trujillo

U
  Scott Uderitz

V
  Dave van den Bergh
  Peter Vermes
  Scott Vermillion
  Sasha Victorine

W
  Tyson Wahl
  Diego Walsh
  Konrad Warzycha †
  Lance Watson
  John Wilson
  David Winner
  Josh Wolff
  Paul Wright

Z
  Kerry Zavagnin
  Gedion Zelalem 
  Adrian Zendejas 
  Sal Zizzo
  Alex Zotincă
  Graham Zusi

Sources
 

Kansas City Wizards
 
Association football player non-biographical articles